Nomasu Nakaguma, also known as Naomasa or Tadamasu Nakaguma, was a colonel and a commander in the Imperial Japanese Army during the Pacific campaign in World War II.  He commanded the 2nd Infantry Division's 4th Infantry Regiment during the strategically significant Guadalcanal campaign. His regiment suffered heavy losses during the Matanikau actions and the decisive Japanese defeat in the Battle for Henderson Field in October 1942, and further losses during the Matanikau Offensive in November 1942. Nakaguma was killed by American artillery fire on or around November 7, 1942

References

Books

Web

Notes

Japanese military personnel of World War II
Japanese military personnel killed in World War II
Japanese Army officers